Anup Nathu (born 8 October 1960) is a New Zealand cricketer. He played in 29 first-class and 16 List A matches for Canterbury and Wellington from 1980 to 1992.

References

External links
 

1960 births
Living people
New Zealand cricketers
Canterbury cricketers
Wellington cricketers
Cricketers from Wellington City